Kenny A. Troutt (born 1948) is an American business man. He founded Excel Communications, a Texas-based telecommunications company that offered long distance phone service. Troutt became a billionaire in 1998 when Excel was sold to Teleglobe for $3.5 billion. As of 2022, his net worth was approx. US $2 billion.

Today, Troutt is the sole owner of WinStar Farm, an elite 2,400 acre thoroughbred horse farm in Versailles, Kentucky. He is also the Chairman of Mt. Vernon Investments. Troutt has won the Kentucky Derby twice, Preakness Stakes once, and the Belmont Stakes three times, including the 13th Triple Crown. He is the owner of Justify, the winner of the 13th Triple Crown. Some notable stallions from Winstar Farm include Super Saver, winner of the 2010 Kentucky Derby; Drosselmeyer, winner of the 2010 Belmont Stakes; Creator, winner of the 2016 Belmont Stakes; and Justify, winner of the 13th Triple Crown.

Troutt is a major Republican donor, and has contributed to American Crossroads, Rick Perry, Rick Santorum, and "Kentuckians for Strong Leadership", a super PAC backing Mitch McConnell. As of 4/19/2022, Troutt has donated $1,409,651, to Texas Republican candidates Greg Abbott, Ken Paxton, and Dan Patrick. Troutt's son, Preston, has also donated to Republican Party candidates.

In 2005 Troutt started the first of three youth basketball teams, known as the Titans, for his sons and the son of a business partner. The teams have an annual budget of $3 million.

Sources
The Excel Phenomenon by James Robinson, Bantam Doubleday. Inc
https://www.transparencyusa.org/tx/donor/kenny-troutt

References

External links
WinStar Farm LLC

1948 births
Living people
People from Dallas
American businesspeople
American billionaires
American racehorse owners and breeders
People associated with direct selling
Texas Republicans
People from Mount Vernon, Illinois